The Thirty-second Oklahoma Legislature was a meeting of the legislative branch of the government of Oklahoma, composed of the Senate and the House of Representatives. State legislators elected in 1968 met at the Oklahoma State Capitol in Oklahoma City for two regular sessions and one special session between January 7, 1969, and April 15, 1970, during the term of Governor Dewey F. Bartlett.

Dates of sessions
First regular session: January 7April 29, 1969
Special session: July 1, 1971
Second regular session: January 6April 15, 1970
Previous: 31st Legislature • Next: 33rd Legislature

Party composition

Senate

House of Representatives

Leadership
President of the Senate: Lieutenant Governor George Nigh
President Pro Tem: Finis Smith
Speaker of the House: Rex Privett
Speaker Pro Tempore: Larry D. Derryberry
Majority Floor Leader: Leland Wolf
Minority Leader: James W. Connor

Members

Senate

Table based on 2005 Oklahoma Almanac.

House of Representatives

Table based on database of historic members.

References

Oklahoma legislative sessions
1969 in Oklahoma
1970 in Oklahoma
1969 U.S. legislative sessions
1970 U.S. legislative sessions